Negar-e Bala (also Romanized as Negar-e Bālā; also known as Negar, Negar-e ‘Olyā, Nīgar, Nigor, Nigwar, and Nūvār-e Bālā) is a village in Jask Rural District, in the Central District of Jask County, Hormozgan Province, Iran. At the 2006 census, its population was 249, in 43 families.

References 

Populated places in Jask County